Claude of France (13 October 1499 – 20 July 1524) was the ruling Duchess of Brittany from 1514 until her death in 1524 and Queen of France by marriage to King Francis I, which was also in 1514, shortly before he became king on the death of her father. She was a daughter of King Louis XII of France and his second wife, the duchess regnant Anne of Brittany.

Life

Claude was born on 13 October 1499 in Romorantin-Lanthenay as the eldest daughter of King Louis XII of France and Duchess Anne of Brittany. She was named after Claudius of Besançon, a saint her mother had invoked during a pilgrimage so she could give birth to a living child: during her two marriages, Queen Anne had at least fourteen pregnancies, of whom only two children survived to adulthood: Claude and her youngest sister Renée, born in 1510.

Marriage negotiations
Because her mother had no surviving sons, Claude was heiress presumptive to the Duchy of Brittany. The crown of France, however, could pass only to and through male heirs, according to Salic Law. Eager to keep Brittany separated from the French crown, Queen Anne, with help of Cardinal Georges d'Amboise, promoted a solution for this problem, a marriage contract between Claude and the future Holy Roman Emperor Charles V.

On 10 August 1501 at Lyon the marriage contract between Claude and the future Holy Roman Emperor Charles V was signed by François de Busleyden, Archbishop of Besançon, William de Croÿ, Nicolas de Rutter and Pierre Lesseman, all ambassadors of Duke Philip of Burgundy, Charles' father. A part of the contract promised the inheritance of Brittany to the young prince, already the next in line to thrones of Castile and Aragon, Austria and the Burgundian Estates.

In addition, the first Treaty of Blois, signed in 1504, gave Claude a considerable dowry in the -likely- case of Louis XII's death without male heirs: besides Brittany, Claude also received the Duchies of Milan and Burgundy, the Counties of Blois and Asti and the territory of the Republic of Genoa, then occupied by France. Thus, all the causes of the future rivalry between Charles V and Francis I were decided even before the succession of the two princes.

In 1505, Louis XII, very sick, fearing for his life and not wishing to threaten the reign of his only heir, cancelled Claude's engagement to Charles in the Estates Generals of Tours, in favor of his heir, the young Duke of Valois. Louise of Savoy had obtained from the king a secret promise that Claude would be married to her son. Queen Anne, furious to see the triumph of the Marshal of Gié, exerted all her influence to obtain his conviction for treason before the Parliament of Paris.

Duchess of Brittany

On 9 January 1514, when her mother died, Claude became Duchess of Brittany; and four months later, on 18 May, at the age of 14, she married her cousin Francis at Saint-Germain-en-Laye. With this union, it was secured that Brittany would remain united to the French crown, unless the third marriage of Louis XII with Mary of England (celebrated on 9 October 1514) produced the long-waited heir. However, the third marriage of Louis XII was short-lived and childless: Louis XII died on 1 January 1515, less than three months after the wedding, reputedly worn out by his exertions in the bedchamber. Francis and Claude became king and queen, the third time in history that the Duchess of Brittany became Queen of France.

As Duchess of Brittany, Claude left all the affairs of the Duchy to her spouse; she did, however, refuse his repeated suggestion to have Brittany incorporated into France, and instead named her oldest son heir to the duchy.

Queen of France
As Queen, Claude was eclipsed at court by her mother-in-law, Louise of Savoy, and her sister-in-law, the literary Navarrese queen Margaret of Angoulême. She never ruled over Brittany; in 1515 she gave the government of her domains to her husband in perpetuity. Unlike her younger sister Renée, she seems to have never showed any interest in her maternal inheritance nor had any disposition to politics, as she preferred to devote herself to religion under the influence, according to some sources, of Christopher Numar of Forlì, who was the confessor of her mother-in-law. Gabriel Miron repeated his functions under Anne of Brittany and remained as Chancellor of Queen Claude and first doctor; he wrote a book entitled de Regimine infantium tractatus tres.

After Francis became king in 1515, Anne Boleyn stayed as a member of Claude's household. It is assumed that Anne served as Claude's interpreter whenever there were English visitors, such as in 1520, at the Field of Cloth of Gold. Anne Boleyn returned to England in late 1521, where she eventually became Queen of England as the second wife of Henry VIII. Diane de Poitiers, another of Claude's ladies, was a principal inspiration of the School of Fontainebleau of the French Renaissance, and became the lifelong mistress of Claude's son, Henry II.

Claude was crowned Queen of France at St. Denis Basilica on 10 May 1517 by Cardinal Philippe de Luxembourg (also known as Cardinal du Mans), who "anointed her in the breast and forehead".

She spent almost all her marriage in an endless round of annual pregnancies. Her husband had many mistresses, but was usually relatively discreet. Claude imposed a strict moral code on her own household, which only a few chose to flout.

About Claude, the historian Brantôme wrote:

I must speak about madame Claude of France, who was very good and very charitable, and very sweet to everyone and never showed displeasure to anybody in her court or of her domains. She was deeply loved by the King Louis and the Queen Anne, her father and mother, and she was always a good daughter to them; after the King took the peaceful Duke of Milan, he made him declare and proclaim her in the Parliament of Paris the Duchess of the two most beautiful Duchies of Christendom, Milan and Brittany, one from the father and the other from the mother. What an heiress! if you please. Both Duchies joined in all good deed to our beautiful kingdom.

The pawn of so much dynastic maneuvering, Claude was short in stature and afflicted with scoliosis, which gave her a hunched back, while her husband was bigger and athletic. The successive pregnancies made her appear continuously plump, which drew mockeries at Court. Foreign ambassadors noted her "corpulence", claudication (tendency to limping), the strabismus affecting her left eye, her small size, and her ugliness, but they acknowledged her good qualities. She was little loved at court after the death of her parents. Brantôme testified:

That the king, her husband gave her the pox, which shortened her days. And madame the Regent [Louise of Savoy] bullied her constantly [...].

The king's will imposed the omnipresence of his mistress, Françoise de Foix.

Death
Claude died on 20 July 1524 at the Château de Blois, aged twenty-four. The exact cause of her death was disputed among sources and historians: while some alleged that she died in childbirth or after a miscarriage, others believed that she died for exhaustion after her many pregnancies or after suffering from bone tuberculosis (like her mother) and finally some believed that she died from syphilis caught from her husband. She was buried at St. Denis Basilica.

She was initially succeeded as ruler of Brittany by her eldest son, the Dauphin Francis, who became Duke Francis III, with Claude's widower King Francis I as guardian. After the Dauphin's death in 1536, Claude's second son, Henry, Duke of Orleans, became Dauphin and Duke of Brittany. He later became King of France as Henry II.

Claude's widowed husband himself remarried several years after Claude's death, to Eleanor of Austria, the sister of Emperor Charles V. The atmosphere at court became considerably more debauched, and there were rumours that King Francis's death in 1547 was due to syphilis.

Issue
Claude and Francis I had seven children, two of whom lived past the age of thirty:
 Louise (19 August 1515 – 21 September 1518, aged three): died young, engaged to Charles I of Spain almost from birth until death.
 Charlotte (23 October 1516 – 8 September 1524, aged seven): died young, engaged to Charles I of Spain from 1518 until death.
 Francis (28 February 1518 – 10 August 1536, aged 18), who succeeded Claude as Duke of Brittany, but died unmarried and childless.
 Henry II (31 March 1519 – 10 July 1559, aged 40), who succeeded Francis I as King of France and married Catherine de' Medici, by whom he had issue.
 Madeleine (10 August 1520 – 2 July 1537, aged 16), who married James V of Scotland and had no issue.
 Charles (22 January 1522 – 9 September 1545, aged 23), who died unmarried and childless.
 Margaret (5 June 1523 – 14 September 1574, aged 51), who married Emmanuel Philibert, Duke of Savoy, in 1559 and had issue.

"Reine Claude" 
Claude is remembered in a classic small plum, the size of a walnut, pale green with a glaucous bloom. It is still called "Reine Claude" (literally, "Queen Claude") in France and is known in England as a "greengage".

Depictions in popular culture
Queen Claude of France is played by Gabriella Wright in season one of the Showtime series The Tudors.

"Kind Queen Claude" is a major character in Robin Maxwell's Mademoiselle Boleyn.

In the 2015–16 Spanish historical fiction television series Carlos, rey emperador (Charles, King Emperor), Queen Claude is played by Eva Rufo.

Ancestry

References

1499 births
1524 deaths
15th-century Breton women
16th-century Breton women
16th-century dukes of Brittany
16th-century peers of France
16th-century women rulers
Burials at the Basilica of Saint-Denis
Dauphines of Viennois
Duchesses of Milan
Dukes of Brittany
Francis I of France
Brittany, Claude, Duchess of
French princesses
French Roman Catholics
French queens consort
House of Valois-Orléans
Deaths in childbirth
Daughters of kings